Euprotomus bulla, common name : the Bubble Conch, is a species of sea snail, a marine gastropod mollusk in the family Strombidae, the true conchs.

Description
The shell size varies between 48 mm and 90 mm.

Distribution
This species is distributed in the Pacific Ocean along Indonesia, 
the Ryukyus (Japan) and Samoa.

Habitat
Known from depths around 500 feet, via tangle nets.

References

 Walls, J.G. (1980). Conchs, tibias and harps. A survey of the molluscan families Strombidae and Harpidae. T.F.H. Publications Ltd, Hong Kong

External links
 

Strombidae
Gastropods described in 1798